Apocalymene is a genus of trilobite in the order Phacopida, which existed in what is now Australia. It was described by Chatterton & Campbell in 1980, and the type species is Apocalymene copinsensis.

References

External links
 Apocalymene at the Paleobiology Database

Calymenidae
Fossils of the Czech Republic
Trilobites of Australia
Phacopida genera